Air Astana is an airline group based in  Almaty, Kazakhstan. It operates scheduled international and domestic services on 64 routes from its main hub, Almaty International Airport, and from its secondary hub, Nursultan Nazarbayev International Airport. Air Astana is a joint venture between Kazakhstan's sovereign wealth fund Samruk-Kazyna (51%), and BAE Systems PLC (49%). The airline was incorporated in October 2001 and started commercial flights on 15 May 2002. It is one of a small number of airlines which has required neither government subsidy nor shareholder financial support to overcome the effects of the COVID-19 pandemic, thus preserving its central corporate principle of financial, managerial and operational independence.

History
Air Astana was described by the Centre for Asia Pacific Aviation in January 2012 as having "performed better in its first decade than just about any other start-up carrier". However, its origins represent one of the more intriguing and unlikely stories to have emerged from the airline industry in recent times. Originally conceived as a purely domestic airline, BAE Systems agreed in mid-2001 to participate in the proposed start-up at the request of Kazakhstan's head of state, President Nursultan Nazarbayev, in order to facilitate an air radar contract it was then negotiated with the Government of Kazakhstan. Sir Richard Evans, BAE Systems' chairman at the time, was instrumental in and key to the deal. However, the radar contract never materialized, and subsequent senior management changes and strategic reviews at BAE Systems led to the closure of its offices in Kazakhstan. Additionally, not withstanding the support of Nazarbayev, the start-up, initially seen as a foreign entity, was confronted with immediate and vocal opposition from many elements of Kazakhstan's media and political establishment.

2002–2005
In spite of a lack of support, the airline took off on the charge. Under its first operational president, former British Airways executive Lloyd Paxton (there had been a brace of short-lived pre-operational incumbents), it leased its first 3 Boeing 737s from International Lease Finance Corporation (ILFC) and commenced Commercial operations on 15 May 2002. In late 2003 Fokker 50s were leased from Aircraft Finance Trading BV (AFT) and 3 Boeing 757s from Pegasus Leasing Corp. It declared a net profit in 2003, its first full year of operations. Upon the bankruptcy of the previous flag carrier Air Kazakhstan in February 2004, it moved quickly to expand from its domestic network to key international routes to Dubai, Istanbul, Moscow and Beijing, followed by Frankfurt and London.

2005–present
Early growth pains and disagreements over fleet plans and hub strategy led to tensions between the shareholders and a management change in autumn 2005. Peter Foster, a former executive of Cathay Pacific Airways who had led the rehabilitation team at Philippine Airlines in 1999 before a spell as CEO at Royal Brunei Airlines, was appointed as the airline's president on 1 October 2005. Long-term development plans and management structures were established that have remained largely unchanged since then. The airline has been consistently profitable and was listed in the top 20 most profitable airlines in terms of net margin in the world for the years 2010, 2011, and 2012, according to Airline Business and Air Finance Journal, which ranked it 20th in its 2015 survey of global airline financial ratings, with a score of BBB−.

In an article on BAE Systems' offset programmes (10/10/13) the Financial Times stated, "BAE’s 49 per cent stake in Kazakhstan’s Air Astana became one of the company’s highest-yielding investments".

Until 8 December 2016, Air Astana was the only Kazakh airline allowed to fly to the European Union.

Air Astana was the "Official Air Carrier of EXPO-2017" and the official carrier and general partner of the 2017 Winter Universiade, which took place from 29 January to 8 February 2017 in Almaty.

Air Astana airline's fleet consists of 36 (as of January 2022) aircraft. As a result of the restructuring of the fleet and the replacement of Boeing 757 and Embraer 190s by Airbus A321neo Long Range and Embraer E2s in 2020/2021, the average age of the Air Astana fleet decreased to 3.6 years as of 2022, one of the youngest in the world. The company plans to expand its fleet up to 54 by 2025.

FlyArystan
In November 2018, the airline announced plans to launch a low-cost airline, FlyArystan,[8] FlyArystan began operations on 1 May 2019 with a pair of Airbus 320s configured to 180 seats operating a classic low cost model, on the same Airline Operator Certificate (AOC) as its parent but with a separate specialist management. As of January 2022, Fly Arystan operated 10 A320s with a further 7 on firm order through to 2023. The high passenger growth of Fly Arystan (553% 2021 v 2020) has contributed to Kazakhstan becoming the fastest growing domestic aviation market in the world in 2021.

Operations

Activity in Russia
In September 2002 the airline launched flights between Astana and Moscow with a frequency of 3 times a week and daily flights between Almaty and Moscow performed by Boeing 737-700. In 2014, the number of weekly services on the Astana – Moscow route was increased up to 9 flights a week, and Almaty – Moscow flights up to 14. Prior to the coronavirus pandemic, the airline operated 54 weekly services on 11 routes to Russia: Almaty – Moscow performed by Airbus A321 and Boeing 767, Astana – Moscow, Almaty – St.Petersburg performed by Airbus A320 and Astana – Novosibirsk, Astana – Yekaterinburg, Astana – Omsk, Astana – St.Petersburg, Almaty – Kazan, and Almaty – Samara performed by Embraer 190.

After a pandemic-driven halt from March to May 2020, the airline resumed services from Almaty and NurSultan to Moscow's Domodedovo Airport, and between Almaty and St Petersburg, both operated in code-share with its long-term code-share partner S7 Airlines of Russia. In addition FlyArystan started operating from Karaganda International Airport to Moscow Domodedovo, and from Almaty to Novosibirsk.

On March 11, 2022, the group suspended all flights to, from and over Russia due to sanctions and restrictions imposed on a number of essential business partners as a consequence of the war in Ukraine.

Activity in the rest of C.I.S.
Air Astana has built on its geographical strength by expanding its network to cover all key cities of the region with short haul flights.
In Central Asia and the Caucasus, the airline flies   to Bishkek (Kyrgyzstan), Tashkent (Uzbekistan), Baku (Azerbaijan), Tbilisi (Georgia), Kyiv (Ukraine) and Dushanbe (Tajikistan) both from Almaty and Astana. Following the global pandemic, all these routes, which were temporarily suspended from March to May 2020, were resumed, and FlyArystan started operating to Kutaisi (Georgia).

Activity in China and Korea
Prior to the pandemic, the airline operated daily flights to Beijing from both Almaty and NurSultan, and flights to Ürümqi in western China. Since July 2020 passenger charter flights have been resumed to Chengdu International Airport, in addition to regular all-cargo charters to various points in China with a partially-converted Boeing 767. In reflection of increasing passenger demand, the aircraft was re-converted to a passenger configuration in September 2021.

Following the pandemic, flights which had been operated daily to Seoul (Korea) from Almaty and twice a week from NurSultan have been reduced to a once weekly flight between Almaty and Seoul because of travel restrictions imposed by the Government of Korea. Flights between Almaty and Hong Kong have been indefinitely suspended.

ICAO and the EU
The airline's international route development was heavily influenced by regulatory factors from 2009 until April 2014. In April 2009, an audit by the International Civil Aviation Organization (ICAO), found the Kazakhstan Civil Aviation Committee (CAC) to be non-compliant in key areas of regulatory oversight. This resulted in, with the exception of Air Astana, a blanket ban of all Kazakhstan-registered airlines from flying to, from or within the European Union by the EU's Air Safety Committee (ASC), until the ban was lifted on 8 December 2016. Air Astana was exempted from the ban "...taking into account oral and written presentations made...." particularly the registration of its aircraft with the Department of Civil Aviation of Aruba, a Netherlands dependent territory, and its operations safety management programme as presented to the ASC. However, it was included on the ASC's Annex B, restricting its EU operations to the level of frequencies and fleet operated at the time of imposition of the ban in July 2009. The ASC removed the fleet restriction in November 2012 for the Boeing and Airbus fleet based on the airline's fleet renewal programme but retained the restriction on Embraer aircraft. On 10 April 2014 the ASC lifted the frequency restrictions based on the airline's safety performance, including Safety Audit of Foreign Airlines (SAFA) monitoring programme results, as well as continuing transparent communications. This allowed the airline to start planning for new destinations in Europe and increases to its daily service to Frankfurt from Astana, a 6x weekly service to Amsterdam from Atyrau, and a 4x weekly services to London. The airline subsequently commenced service between Astana and Paris in April 2015. The restrictions on the Embraer aircraft, which were the last to be banned from the EU, were removed in December 2015.

During the global pandemic, the airline was able to maintain flights between Atyrau and Amsterdam (its only international route at that time) in order to transport key oil field workers to and from Western Kazakhstan. Since July 2020 its other EU operations have gradually resumed, and by January 2022 the airlines was operating from NurSultan to Frankfurt (in code-share with Lufthansa German Airlines) and London Heathrow, in addition to its Amsterdam and Frankfurt flights from Atyrau and Urlask.

Destinations

Air Astana's 42 routes include 27 international and 15 domestic destinations. The airline covers most large cities in Central Asia and Caucasus (and formerly Siberia), which is the result of a decision to implement what its managers refer to as an "extended home-market strategy", to leverage its reputation for high standards of service and air safety compliance in the region's growing air transport markets. Since 2009 it has launched services to Baku, Tashkent, Ürümqi, Tbilisi, Dushanbe, Bishkek, Novosibirsk, Samara, Yekaterinburg, Saint Petersburg, and from the middle of 2012 – Kazan and Omsk. Routes from Almaty and Astana to Kyiv were launched in spring 2013.

Its long haul growth has been towards south and east Asia, with flights to Delhi, Seoul (operated in code share with Asiana Airlines), Beijing, Bangkok, Kuala Lumpur, Hong Kong (28 August 2012) and Ho Chi Minh City (January 2013). In addition to its existing Almaty-Seoul services, Air Astana launched service from Astana to Seoul in June 2015. Air Astana operates daily services from Astana to Frankfurt, three weekly services to Heathrow and three weekly services to Paris (launched 29 March 2015). The European services are connected with Air Astana's extensive domestic services as well as regional services in South Russia, Central Asia and China. The airline launched a non-stop flight from Almaty to Tehran, the capital of the Islamic Republic of Iran (30 June 2016). Flights to Tehran were suspended in June 2017. Flights to Russia were suspended in spring 2022.

Lifestyle Destinations

Air Astana was additionally obliged to cease flights from Kazakhstan to Bangkok and Kuala Lumpur in March 2020 due to strict COVID-19-driven travel restrictions across Southeast Asia. In October 2020, following partial withdrawal of travel restrictions for both Kazakhstan citizens and at certain leisure destinations, the airline resumed services to Antalya (Turkey) and Sharm El Sheikh (Egypt), and commenced flying to The Maldives (Male International Airport) and Colombo (Sri Lanka). These flights, referred to as “lifestyle routes” by the airline's management due to an increased average length of stay at destinations by travellers, were added to in March 2021. As of January 2022 Air Astana operates the following such routes either on a year-round or seasonal basis:

 Almaty to Male (The Maldives)
 Almaty to Colombo (Sri Lanka)
 Almaty to Goa (India)
 Almaty to Phuket (Thailand)
 Almaty to Antalya (Turkey)
 Almaty to Bodrum (Turkey)
 Almaty to Sharm El Sheikh (Egypt)
 Almaty to Hurghada (Egypt)
 Almaty to Podgorica (Montenegro)   
 Almaty to Batumi (Georgia)
 Almaty and Astana to Dubai (UAE) 
 Aktau and Shymkent to Dubai (operated by FlyArystan)
 Aktau and Astana to Kutaisi, Georgia (operated by FlyArstan)
 Almaty and Astana to Heraklion, Greece (operated by Air Astana)

Codeshare agreements
Air Astana has codeshare agreements with the following airlines:

 Air France
 Air India
 Asiana Airlines
 Bangkok Airways
 Cathay Pacific
 KLM
 LOT Polish Airlines
 Lufthansa
 S7 Airlines
 Turkish Airlines
 Ukraine International Airlines

Interline agreements
Air Astana has interline agreements with the following airlines:

 AccesRail
 Aeroflot
 Air France 
 Air Malta
 Alitalia
 Air India
 airBaltic
 All Nippon Airways
 Asiana Airlines
 Austrian Airlines
 Azerbaijan Airlines
 Bangkok Airways
 Belavia
 British Airways
 Cathay Pacific
 Cayman Airways
 China Southern Airlines
 Czech Airlines
 Delta Air Lines
 EgyptAir
 El Al
 Emirates 
 Etihad Airways
 Garuda Indonesia
 Georgian Airways
 Hahn Air
 Hainan Airlines
 Hong Kong Airlines
 Japan Airlines
 KLM
 Korean Air
 Malaysia Airlines 
 MIAT Mongolian Airlines
 LOT Polish Airlines
 Lufthansa
 Philippine Airlines
 Qatar Airways
 Qantas
 Royal Jordanian
 S7 Airlines
 Saudia
 Shandong Airlines
 Singapore Airlines
 SriLankan Airlines
 TAROM
 Thai Airways
 Turkish Airlines
 Ukraine International Airlines
 United Airlines
 Uzbekistan Airways
 Vietnam Airlines
 FitsAir

Fleet

Current fleet

The Air Astana fleet (excluding subsidiary airline FlyArystan) consists of the following aircraft (as of December 2022):

Fleet history
 
Air Astana's fleet history:

Service and branding
The airline has over the years acquired a reputation for high quality customer service, evidenced by multiple awards from Skytrax, Trip Advisor and APEX (see below).

During the ATW's 41st Annual Airline Industry Achievement Awards ceremony in Washington, DC on 25 February 2015 Air Astana was awarded the Airline Market Leader of the Year.

Class types
Air Astana operates a 2 class service, Business and Economy, on all aircraft, and Economy Sleeper on its Airbus 321neo Long Range aircraft. All aircraft with the exception of its Embraer E2s are equipped with an individual in-flight entertainment system supplied by RAVE in both cabins.

Nomad Club
The Nomad Club frequent flyer program consists of Diamond, Gold, Silver and Blue membership tiers, and has reciprocal agreements with Lufthansa's Miles & More and Asiana Airlines's "Asiana Club" programs.

Personnel
Air Astana employs 5,600 people, mostly in Kazakhstan, supplemented by local employees at its foreign offices. It employs 460 pilots, of whom 64 are foreign nationals. All of its pilots hold EASA-European licenses. Since 2008 it has operated an ab-initio pilot training program for Kazakhstan nationals at flight training schools in the US and EU. As of January 2022, 320 of its operating pilots were graduates of this scheme. In 2012 company introduced a general management training program at Cranfield University, UK, since transferring to Henley Business School, UK) The airline's cabin crew consists of over 1,100 flight attendants, all of whom  are Kazakhstan nationals. Its management is a combination of Kazakhstan and foreign nationals.

Activity indicators
Number of passengers transported:

Awards
 Skytrax 4 Star Airline, 2010 to present.
 Skytrax World Airline Awards, Best Airline Central Asia and India, 2012, 2013, 2014, 2015, 2016, 2017, 2018, 2019 and Best Airline in Central Asia 2021 (Skytrax awards were suspended in 2020), and Best Airline Central Asia and CIS 2022.
 Air Transport World Industry Awards, Global Market Leadership Award, 2015. 
 Tripadvisor 2018, 2019 and 2020 Travelers' Choice Awards, Best Regional Airline Asia.
Five Star Airline Rating in the Major Regional Airlines category at the APEX Awards 2018, 2019, 2020, 2021 
 UK New Year's Honours List 2015, Peter Foster appointed Officer of the Order of the British Empire (OBE) for services to British aviation in Kazakhstan.

Accidents and incidents

On 11 November 2018, Air Astana Flight 1388, an Embraer ERJ-190, suffered severe control problems after takeoff due to faulty installation of control cables following a heavy maintenance check by a third-party maintenance provider in Portugal. After more than 90 minutes, the aircraft, with three flight deck and three maintenance personnel on board, was able to land at Beja Airbase. However the aircraft suffered severe multiple structural stress and was written off.

References

External links

Airlines of Kazakhstan
Airlines established in 2001
Airlines formerly banned in the European Union
2001 establishments in Kazakhstan
Kazakhstani brands